A girlfriend experience (GFE) is a commercial sex service that blurs the boundaries between a financial transaction and a romantic relationship. It ranges from a transactional sex relationship to a client paying a sex worker to pretend to be his girlfriend during the session. If the sex worker is male, the service is called a boyfriend experience.

North America 
Within the sex industry of the United States and Canada, the term GFE is commonly used to describe a sexual encounter in which both the sex worker and the client provide each other with reciprocal sexual pleasure and some degree of emotional intimacy. The girlfriend experience, often provided through an escort agency, is a popular service that involves more personal interaction than a traditional call girl offers. There is a focus on not just having sex, but also having more of a comprehensive experience. The details vary widely from person to person. In the field of sex work, sex workers impart a sense of authenticity in order to make the experience more pleasurable for their customer, as well as to make the outcome more lucrative for themselves. According to sociologist Elizabeth Bernstein, this makes it more meaningful for both client and sex worker as it involves a particular form of emotional labor.

The term "client" is often used to describe a person who pays prostitutes for sex. However, in the escort agency code that has grown up around the GFE, clients often call themselves "hobbyists" and refer to a prostitute who provides a GFE as a "nice girl". In a GFE situation, the client would pay for time spent with the call girl meaning: social interaction, dating, or sexual acts. Many clients emerge through the need for a feeling of closeness without the commitment of a relationship. To a certain extent, it eliminates the feeling of guilt or fear of "addiction" to a relationship.

Indoor prostitution, which includes the use of massage parlors, saunas, brothels, strip clubs and escort agencies, is more likely than street prostitution to involve conversation, affection and mutual sexual pleasure. Some ranch brothels in the United States advertise themselves as GFE establishments, including Dennis Hof's Love Ranch South, Moonlite Bunny Ranch, Kit Kat Ranch, Sheri's Ranch and the Chicken Ranch.

Southeast Asia
Research in Cambodia published in 2010 identified a number of waitresses and bartenders who were also working as "professional girlfriends" with "western boyfriends". They relied on these relationships for their livelihood but did not regard themselves as "prostitutes" and often sought love and marriage as well as material comforts. In these relationships, there was a performance of intimacy which lay somewhere between the feigned and the genuine.

In Thailand, some independent sex workers are reported to work as "professional girlfriends", providing company and affection to foreign men and middle-class Thai men, and only having sex with their clients occasionally. Their remuneration is provided in the form of things such as clothing and visits to the cinema.

See also
 Enjo kōsai (compensated dating) 
 Geisha
 Rental family service
 Seeking.com
 Sugar dating

References

Further reading
 
 
 
 
 
 
 

Prostitution
Sexual slang